Simon James Bassey (born 5 February 1976) is an English former footballer. During his playing career he played as a midfielder. Bassey was also temporary caretaker manager/coach at Portsmouth from 3 January 2023 until 20 January 2023.

Career

Playing career
Bassey joined Wimbledon F.C. at the age of 8 and remained with the club until he was released at the age of 16. He made over 150 appearances for Carshalton Athletic as well as playing for Aldershot Town and AFC Wimbledon.

Coaching career
He went on to become first team coach at AFC Wimbledon when he retired due to injury in 2004. He acted as caretaker manager of the club between 19 September 2012 and 10 October 2012, before resuming his post as coach following the appointment of Neal Ardley. He again took over as caretaker manager on 12 November 2018 after the departure of Neal Ardley and Neil Cox. He left the club by mutual consent at the end of the 2018-19 season.

On 7 April 2021, Bassey was appointed First Team Coach at National League side Barnet, initially as the most senior coach for the first team and leading the team in training and on matchdays. Bassey left the Bees at the end of the season to pursue an opportunity with an English Football League club.

Two days later he was announced as first team assistant coach at Portsmouth. Bassey became interim head coach at Portsmouth on 3 January 2023 after Danny Cowley was dismissed the previous day.  Simon Bassey departed on 20 January 2023 when John Mousinho was appointed as Head Coach by Portsmouth F.C..

Managerial statistics

References

1976 births
Living people
English footballers
Association football midfielders
Carshalton Athletic F.C. players
Aldershot Town F.C. players
Dulwich Hamlet F.C. players
Crawley Town F.C. players
Tooting & Mitcham United F.C. players
AFC Wimbledon players
AFC Wimbledon non-playing staff
Portsmouth F.C. non-playing staff
English Football League managers
National League (English football) managers
AFC Wimbledon managers
Barnet F.C. managers
English football managers
Association football coaches